Aleksander Vishaj also known as Aleks Vishaj (born September 28, 1989) is an Albanian-British criminal. In April 2021, Medias over UK described Vishaj as King of TikTok he was extradited from the United Kingdom to Albania to serve a sentence for violent and brazen home invasion robbery.

Vishaj is known for living a luxury life as gambler. While he was supposed to serve the sentence in Albania, the medias in UK reported in headlines that he challenged the UK government by showing himself again in London although he was restricted to enter United Kingdom.

In Nov 2021, Vishaj was released from prison. Following his release, he publicly denounced organized crime and became a Video creator, and Motivational speaker.

References

Living people
1989 births
Albanian emigrants to the United Kingdom
British motivational speakers